Shaone Morrisonn (born December 23, 1982) is a Canadian-Croatian professional ice hockey defenceman who is currently under contract with the Dubai Mighty Camels in the Emirates Ice Hockey League (EHL). He played for the Boston Bruins, Washington Capitals and the Buffalo Sabres during his eight-year NHL career.

Playing career 
Morrisonn started his hockey career with the Vancouver Thunderbird Minor Hockey Association (VTMHA). After proving himself at the community level, he was drafted by the Kamloops Blazers of the WHL and subsequently drafted in the 1st round, 19th overall by the Boston Bruins in the 2001 NHL Entry Draft.  He was later dealt to the Capitals on March 3, 2004 in the trade that sent Sergei Gonchar to the Bruins.  While with the Bruins, Morrisonn scored his first NHL goal.  It came in Boston's 4-3 home win over Toronto on January 1, 2004.

Morrisonn was often paired with 2007–08 NHL lead goal-scoring defenceman Mike Green. He began to prove himself as a tough, stay-at-home defenceman.  During the 2008 NHL playoffs, he played every game with a broken jaw and a separated shoulder.

In 2008, after a long negotiation with the Capitals, Morrisonn filed for arbitration as he wanted to stay with the team but could not come to an agreement on financial terms.  On July 26, 2008, an arbitrator awarded a one-year contract worth $1.975 million.

On August 2, 2010 Morrisonn came to terms with the Buffalo Sabres on a two-year contract. Prior to his second season with the Sabres, on September 24, 2011 he was waived and later reassigned to the  AHL affiliate Rochester Americans for the 2011–12 season.

Morrisonn played for HC Spartak Moscow on a one-year contract in the 2012–13 season.

In November 2019, Morrisonn moved to the UK to sign for EIHL side Cardiff Devils.

Career statistics

Regular season and playoffs

International

References

External links 

1982 births
Admiral Vladivostok players
Boston Bruins draft picks
Boston Bruins players
Buffalo Sabres players
Canadian ice hockey defencemen
HC CSKA Moscow players
Ice hockey people from Vancouver
Surrey Eagles players
Kamloops Blazers players
KHL Medveščak Zagreb players
Living people
National Hockey League first-round draft picks
Oji Eagles players
Portland Pirates players
Providence Bruins players
Rochester Americans players
HC Spartak Moscow players
HC TPS players
Washington Capitals players
Cardiff Devils players
Canadian expatriate ice hockey players in Croatia
Canadian expatriate ice hockey players in Finland
Canadian expatriate ice hockey players in Russia
Naturalized citizens of Croatia
Canadian expatriate ice hockey players in the United States
Canadian expatriate ice hockey players in the United Arab Emirates
Canadian expatriate ice hockey players in Wales
Canadian expatriate ice hockey players in Japan
Croatian expatriate ice hockey people
Croatian expatriate sportspeople in Wales
Croatian expatriate sportspeople in the United Arab Emirates
Naturalised sports competitors